The JOD 35 or Jeanneau One Design 35 is a French sailboat that was designed by Daniel Andrieu as an one design racer and first built in 1991.

The JOD 35 was the one design class boat for the Tour de France à la voile from 1992 to 1998.

Production
The design was built by Jeanneau in France, from 1991 until 1995 with 240 boats completed, but it is now out of production.

Design

The Jeanneau One Design 35 is a racing keelboat, built predominantly of polyester fiberglass, including  PVC-fiberglass sandwich, with carbon fiber reinforcement. It has a fractional sloop rig, with a keel-stepped mast, two sets of swept spreaders and aluminum spars with discontinuous stainless steel rod rigging. The hull has a raked stem, a reverse transom with steps, an internally mounted spade-type rudder controlled by a tiller and a fixed fin keel with an "L"-shaped weighted bulb. It displaces  and carries  of cast iron ballast.

The design has sleeping accommodation for six people, with a double "V"-berth in the bow cabin, two straight settee berths in the main cabin two quarter berths aft. The galley is located on the port side just forward of the companionway ladder. The galley is "L"-shaped and is equipped with a two-burner stove, an ice box and a sink. A navigation station is opposite the galley, on the starboard side. The head is located in the bow cabin under the "V"-berth.

Operational history
Introduced at the Paris Boat Show in 1990, the JOD 35 was selected to succeed the Selection 37 in the Tour de France à la voile in 1992, and was replaced by the Mumm 30 for 1999. It was also the boat used in the ACI Match Race Cup in Croatia.

During its time as the Tour de France à la voile boat, it was supported by that organization as a one-design class.

See also
List of sailing boat types

References

External links

Video tour of the Jeanneau One Design 35

Keelboats
1990s sailboat type designs
Sailing yachts
One-design sailing classes
Tour de France à la voile
Sailboat type designs by Daniel Andrieu
Sailboat types built by Jeanneau